Middlesex 1 was an English level 10 Rugby Union league with teams from north-west London taking part.  Promoted teams used to move up to Herts/Middlesex 1 and relegation was to Middlesex 2.  The division was cancelled in at the end of the 1995–96 campaign after nine seasons due to the merger of the Hertfordshire and Middlesex regional leagues.

Original teams
When league rugby began in 1987 this division contained the following teams:

Finchley
Hampstead
Lensbury
London New Zealand
Old Haberdashers
Old Meadonians
Old Millhillians
Orleans FP
Staines
Sudbury Court
Uxbridge

Middlesex 1 honours

Middlesex 1 (1987–1992)

The original Middlesex 1 was a tier 8 league with promotion up to London 3 North West and relegation down to Middlesex 2.

Middlesex 1 (1992–1996)

The creation of Herts/Middlesex at the beginning of the 1992–93 season meant that Middlesex 1 dropped to become a tier 9 league.  The introduction of National 5 South for the 1993–94 season meant that Middlesex 1 dropped another level to become a tier 10 league for the years that National 5 South was active.  Promotion was into the new Herts/Middlesex league while relegation continued into Middlesex 2.  The merging of the Hertfordshire and Middlesex regional divisions at the end of the 1995–96 season meant that Middlesex 1 was cancelled.

Number of league titles

Finchley (1)
Hackney (1)
Hampstead (1)
Lensbury (1)
Mill Hill (1)
Old Hamptonians (1)
Staines (1)
Twickenham (1)
Uxbridge (1)

Notes

See also
London & SE Division RFU
Middlesex RFU
English rugby union system
Rugby union in England

References

10
Rugby union in Middlesex